Ponceau S, Acid Red 112, or C.I. 27195 (systematic name: 3-hydroxy-4-(2-sulfo-4-[4-sulfophenylazo]phenylazo)-2,7-naphthalenedisulfonic acid sodium salt) is a sodium salt of a diazo dye of a light red color, that may be used to prepare a stain for rapid reversible detection of protein bands on nitrocellulose or polyvinylidene fluoride (PVDF) membranes (western blotting), as well as on cellulose acetate membranes. A Ponceau S stain is useful because it does not appear to have a deleterious effect on the sequencing of blotted polypeptides and is therefore one method of choice for locating polypeptides on western blots for blot-sequencing. It is also easily reversed with water washes, facilitating subsequent immunological detection. The stain can be completely removed from the protein bands by continued washing. Common stain formulations include 0.1% (w/v) Ponceau S in 5% acetic acid or 2% (w/v) Ponceau S in 30% trichloroacetic acid and 30% sulfosalicylic acid.

See also

 Coomassie brilliant blue
Western blot normalization

References

Protein methods
Azo dyes
Acid dyes